Obadiah is a 2010 album released by Canadian musician Frazey Ford. It is Ford's debut solo album.  She had previously released albums as a member of The Be Good Tanyas.

Background
In a change from her work with The Be Good Tanyas, Ford focused on performing soul for Obadiah. The album takes its name from Ford's middle name "Obadiah". When she was born, her parents asked her brothers to choose her middle name; they decided to name her after their pet cat Obadiah that had recently run away.

Recording
Ford recorded the album with guitarist Trish Klein, who was also in The Be Good Tanyas.  Klein's partner, John Raham played drums and produced the album.  Ford's mother, neighbor, and landlord also appear on the record.

Themes
Ford has said that the album relates to an emotional time she had with her family.

Reception
Ben Ratliff of the New York Times gave the album a favorable review and commended Ford's blending of soul and country influences. He compared her singing to a diverse group of artists including Dolly Parton, Ann Peebles and Feist.

Track listing

† Bonus track on some editions of the album.

References

2010 albums
Frazey Ford albums